Berberia abdelkader, the giant grayling, is a species of butterfly in the family Nymphalidae. It is endemic to the North African region, mainly Morocco, Algeria, and Tunisia. It flies in the vast steppes and the males are easily seen flying in search of a shy female.  Usually, females are fertilised as soon as they hatch.

Subspecies
There are three subspecies of Berberia abdelkader:
B. a. abdelkader - (Col du Jerada and Oujda in eastern Morocco, Algeria, western Libya
B. a. nelvai (Seitz, 1911) (Aurès Mountains of Algeria, Moularès Mines of Tunisia)
B. a. taghzefti (Wyatt, 1952) - (Taghzeft Pass  in Morocco)

Flight period
June to October, depending on altitude and locality.

Food plants
Larvae have been recorded on Stipa tenacissima.

References

Satyrinae of the Western Palearctic
Michel Tarrier.es: Berberia abdelkader
Tennent, John, 1996; The Butterflies of Morocco, Algeria and Tunisia; 

Satyrini
Butterflies of Africa
Lepidoptera of North Africa